Matthew John Hindson AM (born 12 September 1968) is an Australian composer.

Biography
Matthew Hindson was born in Wollongong, New South Wales, in 1968. He studied composition at the Universities of Sydney and Melbourne with composers including Peter Sculthorpe, Eric Gross, Brenton Broadstock and Ross Edwards.

Hindson's works have been performed by ensembles and orchestras throughout his native Australia, including most of its professional symphony orchestras and chamber groups. Overseas, his compositions have been presented in New Zealand, Germany, France, Austria, the UK, the Netherlands, Portugal, the United States, Japan, Malaysia, Canada and Thailand, and have been featured at such key events as the 1994 and 2000 Gaudeamus Music Weeks in Amsterdam, the 1997 ISCM Festival in Copenhagen and the 1998 Paris Composers Rostrum.

His music often displays influences of popular music styles within a classical music context, and, as a result, musical elements such as driving repeated rhythms and high dynamic levels are typically found in his works. Indeed, directness and immediacy are common features in much of his music. One of his most notable works, Speed (1996), was thought by some to be inspired by the 1994 hit film Speed; however, Hindson has denied this connection.

In 1999 Hindson was the attached composer to the Sydney Symphony Orchestra. Works written during this attachment include Boom-Box and In Memoriam: Amplified Cello Concerto (the latter was subsequently nominated for an APRA-AMC award for Best Orchestral Work of 2001). He was also the attached composer with the Sydney Youth Orchestra in the same year, for which he was commissioned to write a violin concerto. In 2002 he was the featured composer with Musica Viva Australia for which he has written a number of new commissions for Kristjan Järvi's Absolute Ensemble, baroque violinist Andrew Manze, the Australian oboist Diana Doherty and the Belcea String Quartet, and Duo Sol.

In May 2002, the Sydney Dance Company toured Australia to much acclaim with a new 90-minute production, Ellipse, choreographed by their Artistic Director, Graeme Murphy, and danced entirely to Hindson's music. Playing to packed houses, it broke box-office records for the SDC. They toured it to the US in 2004.

In September 2003, Hindson was a featured composer at the Vale of Glamorgan Festival in Wales, during which fourteen of his works were performed by a variety of ensembles. He was the attached composer to The Queensland Orchestra in 2003/2004, one result of which was his Percussion Concerto, written for Dame Evelyn Glennie and premiered in Brisbane in 2006. In addition, his music was set to a full-evening dance presentation by Ballett Schindowski in Gelsenkirchen, Germany, in January 2004.

Other compositions include two works for the Orchestras of Australia Network, a flute concerto entitled House Music for American flautist Marina Piccinini, premiered with the London Philharmonic Orchestra in December 2006, a Concerto for Two Pianos written for Pascal and Ami Rogé, three ballets written for David Bintley - two commissioned by Birmingham Royal Ballet and one by Sarasota Ballet, and a Soprano Saxophone Concerto - written for Amy Dickson. Matthew Hindson's music is published by Faber Music (UK). A disc of three of his orchestral pieces was recorded by Trust Records with the New Zealand Symphony Orchestra and released in August 2008.

As well as working as a composer, Hindson lectures in the Arts Music Unit and is Associate Professor and Chair of Composition at the Sydney Conservatorium of Music. He has recently co-authored a book entitled "Music Composition Toolbox", published by Science Press. Hindson was from 2004 to 2010 the artistic director of the Aurora Festival, a new festival of contemporary music based in Western Sydney.

Honours
Matthew Hindson was appointed a Member of the Order of Australia in 2006, for "service to the arts as a leading Australian composer and teacher of music, and through the wide promotion of musical works to new audiences".

Selected works

Stage Works
 Symphony No 2: e=mc2, ballet in one act, 2009
 Faster, ballet in one act, 2011
 A Comedy of Errors, ballet in two acts, 2022

Orchestral
 Homage to Metallica, 1994/97
 Speed, 1996
 LiteSpeed, 1996
 Rave-Elation (Extended Mix), 1997
 RPM, 1996/98
 Rave-Elation (Schindowski Mix), 1997/2003
 Boom-Box, 1999
 In Memoriam: Amplified Cello Concerto, 2000
 Violin Concerto No. 1 (Australian Postcards), 2000
 Wind Turbine at Kooragang Island
 Westerway
 Grand Final Day
 Headbanger, 2001
 Rave-Elation, 2002
 A Symphony of Modern Objects, 2003
 Auto-Electric, 2003
 Concerto for Percussion, 2005
 An Infernal Machine, 2006
 House Music (Flute Concerto), 2006
 Flash Madness, 2006
 Kalkadungu (co-composed with William Barton), 2007
 Ictalurus Punctatus, 2008
 Dangerous Creatures, 2008
 Symphony No 2: e=mc2, one-act ballet, 2009
 Energy, 2009
 Concerto for Two Pianos, 2011
 Bright Red Overture for full orchestra, solo trumpet and didjeridu, 2013
 Returned Soldier, The Symphony No 3, 2014
 It is better to be feared than loved, for SATB chorus and orchestra, 2014
 Concerto for Soprano Saxophone & Orchestra, 2019

String orchestra
 Technologic 1–2 for string orchestra and percussion, 1998
 Whitewater for 12 solo strings, 1999–2000
 The Rave and the Nightingale for string quartet and string orchestra, 2001
 Balkan Connection string orchestra, 2003
 Gentle Giant, 2003
 Didjeribluegrass didjeridu, string orchestra and percussion, 2005
 Song and Dance, string orchestra, 2006
 Crime and Punishment double-bass and string orchestra, 2009
 Maralinga violin and string orchestra (named after the 1950s British nuclear test site in the Australian outback), 2009/arr.2011
 Bright Stars for string orchestra of mixed abilities, with piano, 2016
 Atomic Tangerine for string orchestra, or string ensemble, 2017
 Nothing is Forever, for string orchestra, 2018

Ensemble
 Lucky Seven for 10 percussionists, 1995
 Siegfried Interlude No.4 – The Ride of the (Viola) Valkyries 8 violas, 1998
 Technologic 145, for chamber ensemble of 13 players, 1998
 Siegfried Interlude No.1 for brass ensemble, 1999
 Whitewater for 12 solo strings, 1999–2000
 Comin' Right Atcha, for amplified chamber ensemble of 8 players, 2002
 Comin' Right Atcha, for chamber ensemble of 14 players, 2002, 2006
 Spirit Song, for chamber ensemble of 5 players, 2003/2006
 Septet, for chamber ensemble of 7 players, 2009
 Beauty for cello and chamber ensemble of 6 players, 2009
 This Year's Apocalypse for chamber ensemble of 14 players, 2016
 Arrival for carillon, 2017
 Trumpet Concerto for solo trumpet and chamber ensemble of 7 players, 2018–20

Chamber music
 Prelude and Estampie for viola and piano, 1986
 Four Score for 4 solo violins, 1992
 Little Chrissietina's Magic Fantasy for 2 violins, 1994
 DeathStench for amplified flute, amplified clarinet and piano, 1995
 Nintendo Music for clarinet in A and piano, 1995
 Five Movements for saxophone quartet, 1996
 GameBoy Music for clarinet and piano, 1997
 Two Marine Portraits for violin, viola and electronics, 1997
 Chrissietina's Magic Fantasy for violin and viola, 1998
 Ignition: Positive for trumpet or alto saxophone and piano, 1998
 Jungle Fever for cello or tenor saxophone and piano, 1998
 Night Pieces for oboe or soprano saxophone and piano, 1998
 Love Serenade for cello or bassoon and piano, 1998
 n-trance for solo harp, 1998
 Lament for viola and piano, 1996/2002
 Rush for guitar and string quartet, 1999
 Rush for oboe and string quartet, 1999/2001
 Siegfried Interlude No.2 for wind octet, or soprano saxophone and piano, or clarinet and piano, 1999
 Siegfried Interlude No.3 for 3 percussionists, 1999
 Always On Time for violin and cello, 2001
 Pulse Magnet for 2 pianos and 2 percussion, 2001
 Baroquerie, Sonata for Baroque Violin and Harpsichord, 2002
 Industrial Night Music (String Quartet No. 1), 2003
 Basement Art Guru and Other Pieces for solo violin, 2004
 Didjeribluegrass for didjeridu and string quartet, 2005
 Piano Trio, 2006
 Song of Life for solo violin, 2007
 The Metallic Violin for solo violin, 2007
 Light Music for wind quintet, 2007
 Video Game Dreaming for clarinet quartet, 2007
 The Metallic Violins for two violins, 2008
 Shakedown for amplified shakuhachi & CD, 2008
 Violin Concertino: Summer Stories for violin and piano, 2009
 Maralinga for violin and piano, 2009
 Funeral Windows for basset clarinet, 2009
 Big Heart for string quartet, 2009
 Mandalay for solo violin, 2009
 Septet for flute, horn and string quintet, 2009
 The Flash for solo xylophone, 2010
 Video Game Dreaming for saxophone quartet, 2010
 Light is both a particle and a wave for flute, clarinet in A, piano and string quartet, 2010
 Repetepetition for soprano saxophone and piano, 2011
 A Vision in Jade for two violins, 2011/rev.2020
 Remembering Dixie for violin and piano, 2012
 Song for Sophie for violin and piano, 2012
 Epic Diva for piano quartet, 2012
 The stars above us all for chamber orchestra, 2012
 Repetepetition for flute/piccolo and vibraphone, 2013
 Repetepetition for flute/piccolo and piano, 2013
 String Quartet No 2, 2013
 Rush for piano trio, 2015
 String Quartet No 3: Ngeringa, 2015
 String Quartet No 4 for string quartet and solo percussion, 2016
 Scenes from 'Romeo & Juliet''' for saxophone quartet, 2016
 Funeral Oration for solo trumpet, 2016
 Lounge Music arrangement of 3rd movement of flute concerto House Music for clarinet and piano, 2016
 Odysseus and the Sirens, for flute and piano, 2017
 String Quartet No 5 (Celebration), 2017
 Champagne Fanfare, for two flutes, 2017
 After Bach, for string quartet, 2018
 1,2,3,4,5,6,7,8, for violin and cello, 2018
 After Bach, for two baroque violins and viola da gamba, 2018
 Violin Sonata No 1 - 'Dark Matter', for violin and piano, 2018
 Heroes, for solo soprano saxophone, 2020
 Hey, for solo snare drum, 2020
 Andante Amoroso, for violin and viola, 2021

Piano
 AK-47, 1993
 Moments of Plastic Jubilation, 2000
 Monkey Music for Toy Piano and Cymbal Monkey, 2009
 Big Bang for two pianos, 2013
 Visible Weapon for two pianos and electronics, 2013
 La Salsa Sensuale, 2020

Choral
 Pi, 1999
 Velvet Dreams, 1999
 The Blue Alice, 2000
 Heartland, 2001
 It is better to be feared than loved, for SATB chorus and orchestra, 2014
 Electric Rain, for SAB chorus & symphonic wind band, 2019
 da-bi-du, for unaccompanied SSATBarB voices, 2019

Vocal
 Insect Songs, mezzo-soprano and guitar, 1998
 Central Australian Song for soprano and chamber ensemble of 5 players, 2009
 Saviour of the Heathens (on "Nun komm, der Heiden Heiland"), solo tenor, cello and chamber organ, 2017

Symphonic wind band
 RPM, 2002
 Headbanger, 2003
 Requiem for a City (co-composed with Paul Mac), 2015
 Electric Rain'', for SAB chorus & symphonic wind band, 2019

References

External links
 Biography and list of works of Matthew Hindson
 The composer's own blog
 Hindson is Artistic Director of the Aurora Festival, held every 2 years in Western Sydney

1968 births
Living people
20th-century classical composers
20th-century Australian male musicians
20th-century Australian musicians
21st-century classical composers
21st-century Australian male musicians
21st-century Australian musicians
Australian classical composers
Australian male classical composers
Composers for carillon
Members of the Order of Australia